The 1934–35 season was the 58th Scottish football season in which Dumbarton competed at national level, entering the Scottish Football League and the Scottish Cup.  In addition Dumbarton competed in the Dumbartonshire Cup.

Scottish League

After the optimism of the previous season, Dumbarton's 13th season in a row in the Second Division was to prove unlucky as they slumped to finish 16th out of 18, with 22 points - 30 behind champions Third Lanark.  During the season, a number of big defeats were suffered, conceding a 9, an 8 and 6 goals twice.

Scottish Cup

This season it was a second round exit, to First Division St Johnstone.

Dumbartonshire Cup
Dumbarton failed to regain the Dumbartonshire Cup, with amateur side Vale Ocaba retaining the trophy.  Both games were held over until the start of the 1935-36 season.

Player statistics

|}

Source:

Transfers

Players in

Players out 

In addition Thomas Cumming, John Forgie, David Kennedy, William Meek, William Murray, James Osborne and Robert Taylor all played their last games in Dumbarton 'colours'.

Source:

References

Dumbarton F.C. seasons
Scottish football clubs 1934–35 season